Paralemmin is a protein that in humans is encoded by the PALM gene.

This gene encodes a member of the paralemmin protein family. Other members of this family include CAP-23, GAP-43, MARCKS, and MacMARCKS. The product of this gene is a prenylated and palmitoylated phosphoprotein that associates with the cytoplasmic face of plasma membranes and is implicated in plasma membrane dynamics in neurons and other cell types. Several alternatively spliced transcript variants have been identified, but the full-length nature of only two transcript variants has been determined.

References

Further reading